is an American skincare company headquartered in Brooklyn, NY. Founded by oculofacial plastic surgeon Dr. Chaneve Jeanniton, 
 develops products designed particularly for black and brown skin. 
 products are designed to address issues like sensitive skin, over-drying, and hyperpigmentation. Hyperpigmentation is of particular concern to people with melanin overproduction, and many methods to treat it have been found to be unsafe.  develops formulas that eliminate unnecessary additives present in other skin care products that can cause unwanted reactions.

See also
 
 International Nomenclature of Cosmetic Ingredients (INCI)
 Food additive
 List of cosmetic ingredients
 Testing cosmetics on animals

References

Black-owned companies of the United States
Skin care brands
Companies based in Brooklyn
Companies with year of establishment missing